MIT (Metrocargo Intermodal Transport) was a project partly funded by the European Union under the Programme "Research for the benefit of SMEs“ – Call ID "FP7-SME-2011" and managed by Research Executive Agency.
Metrocargo is a concept of intermodal shipment based on horizontal loading and unloading containers and swap bodies on standard flatbed wagons under the overhead electric feeding line. The system being fully automated and very efficient, it is time and cost effective for the distributed intermodal transport over a territory and for processing full trains in port to dry port shuttling. The promoters constructed a full-scale prototype unit and the EC-funded research pro-ject VIT Vision for Innovative Transport successfully researched the remaining technical issues. This MIT Metrocargo Intermodal Transport project is about bringing Metrocargo from research to market stage and promoting its dissemination among logistic decision-makers throughout Europe. Technically, MIT will implement specific technical improvements and the scaling up from single prototypal unit to full industrial installation, developing typical plant design and SW applications to automate and optimise the work flow and provide interfaces with operators and external systems. Promotion and dissemination will be the main goal, carrying out market studies in several EU member states and subsequent market plans to exploit the Metrocargo features in terms of installation and operating costs, limited use of dock area, safety and environmental impact. Economic advantages to operators in typical situations will be deter-mined effecting specific feasibility studies. Dissemination events will be organised centred on the full scale Metrocargo prototype installed in the port of Vado Ligure. The SMEs will exhibit the system in main logistic and transport shows in Europe and will organise road-show presentations in several countries, using videos and a dynamic simulation SW tool to illustrate the solutions for specific needs. At the end of this Project the Metrocargo technology will be a fully developed market-ready system that will be widely known among European logistic decision makers.

Concept 

Today railroad shipment of containers is limited to point-to-point trains, without the possibility of loading and unloading at intermediate stops. The reason is that wagons are loaded and unloaded vertically with gantry cranes or similar equipment, which obviously cannot operate under the overhead electric feeding line. Trains need to be shunted to marshalling yards and back to the regular railway tracks using a diesel locos, which is costly and time-consuming, therefore only point to point trains are operated, excluding transfer and collection of load units along the territory they cross.

Since 2004 the Metrocargo initiative is under development, aimed at enhancing intermodal shipment based on an innovative horizontal loading technology capable of working under the catenary. The equipment developed to that effect proved to be particularly efficient so it can be used in applications where full trains need to be rapidly processed, such as port to dry-port relationship or at interchange point between different track gauges (e.g. Spain to EC).

Technology 

Metrocargo is a fully automated technology developed for (un)loading containers horizontally from wagons to track-side stocking areas and vice versa operating under the catenary. Actually containers are lifted for a small height (up to 161 cm to take care of different heights of wagons) acting on the lateral slots of the standard corner fittings every container and swap body is equipped with. Today the technology is implemented in a working prototype set-up at Vado Ligure (IT).

The basic unit of Metrocargo comprises the elements illustrated in the above pictures and effects the operations described hereunder:
	
 the container is moved from the wagon to the transfer car
 the transfer car discharges the container moves on the appropriate buffer bay
 tin he buffer bay the container is moved to a position farther from the track, to make room for new unit being unloaded

The same sequence in reverse order is effected for loading, with the side slots being replaced by the retaining pins on the wagon.
In the unloading cycle, the side slots of the corner fitting are as an achievement of the VIT project also partly funded by the European Union.
Operating under the catenary, though disconnected during the operation for safety reasons, Metrocargo eliminates the cost and time associated with shunting (coupling and decoupling wagons, transfer to marshalling yards by diesel locos, train breakdown and composition) that take place in traditional terminals, where trains need to be removed from the electrified line for unloading. 
Metrocargo was originally developed as a technical means necessary for creating a network for the intermodal transport of containers and swap bodies, distributed over a territory. In the process, it proved to be very fast (projections show a 40 wagon train can be unloaded and reloaded in less than one hour), which opened up new business possibilities, typically shuttling load units between ports and dry-ports. 
The construction technology being modular, equipment can be planned according to available space and number of containers to be handled, and increased as necessary. 
Today the system is fitted with a stand-alone active safety system detecting human presence in the work area, (which means that sound alarms do not have to be used). This system has been developed within the VIT project.
Metrocargo is perfectly consistent with the goal of minimising environmental impact, because both atmospheric and acoustic pollution are almost eliminated by the electrically powered automation system. There are no local GHG emissions other than by trucks servicing the terminal, and noise level is very low.
Electro-mechanical parts and plant automation software for load/unload were subjected to an exhaustive stress test under the control of an independent entity with specific knowledge of automated plants: Functionality and performance of all components were analysed and data collected and validated. 
The two main applications of Metrocargo are distributed intermodality and Port to dry-port shuttling.

Distributed intermodality 

The concept is to set a system similar to the passenger network, as opposed to current point-to-point container trains. Similarities to passenger transport are outlined in the following table:

Terminals include:

 reception areas, where units are received from shipper or from port docks by truck and unloaded with traditional methods (gantry cranes / reach stackers)
 automated sorting bays, where units are arranged according to the direction of the train to be boarded in that terminal (first leg of the transport)
 loading equipment, effecting the automatic loading and unloading from trains
 terminal control SW and HW

The transport over Metrocargo network is managed by the central control SW, with functions of:

 optimising transport (routing, stopover and transfer at different Metrocargo terminals)
 supervision of local SW systems managing each single terminal
 real time control of terminal and network, simulating alternate solutions to cope with shortcomings and rescheduling all transports accordingly
 forecasting transport flows based on historical data
 simulation of future scenarios to determine best increase and allocation of resources
 business intelligence and administration
 real time communication with customers are transport status and delivery forecast

According to all studies, tests, simulations and business plans the system will be efficient and economically sound (it will be profitable offering lower prices than road transport with comparable delivery time).

The general business scheme foresees:

 setting up a number of Metrocargo terminals in strategic locations. Terminals can be installed in unused sections of existing RR stations or intermodal centres, with good road connections. The flexibility of the system permits to equip the terminal initially with a small number (even 1 or 2) of handling units and limited infrastructure, and to upsize it as necessary. Funding can be provided either by central or local investors (intermodal operators, large shippers, local administrations), or both
 obtaining transport contracts from existing logistic operators and large shippers, at rates lower than road transport
 subcontracting the door pick up and delivery to trucking companies, that will thus recover the loss of long distance haul with a steady local service
 acquiring directly the railroad "slots" to assure the feasibility of the transport
 subcontracting the RR transport to existing railroad companies (scheduled trains on fixed itineraries on regular basis)
 setting up the necessary SW tools to manage the terminals and the network
 managing directly booking, route optimisation, communication with the clients, invoicing etc.

Port to dry-port shuttling 

The efficiency of Metrocargo equipment is well exploited when fast processing of full trains is required, as in shuttling between ports and dry-ports and at gauge-change stations, as at the EC borders with Spain, Russia and Ukraine, and similarly at the Russia–China border.
Performance depends on many factors. Test results projected that a properly dimensioned installation can handle yearly handling up to 600.000 TEUs.
Cost calculations indicate that the handling cost per unit are competitive versus current rates. 
The operation being all electrified and very silent, environmental impacts come almost exclusively from the trucks in and out the intermodal centre, which is unavoidable in all cases.

Project

Objectives 

MIT is a European Project partly funded by the EC: the object of MIT is promotion and dissemination, carrying out market studies in several EU member states and subsequent market plans.
The goal is to exploit the Metrocargo features in terms of installation and operating costs, limited use of dock area, safety and environmental impact. 
Another objective of MIT is to implement specific technical improvements and the scaling up from single prototypal unit to full industrial installation, developing typical plant design and SW applications to automate and optimise the work flow and provide interfaces with operators and external systems.

Partners 

The partners of MIT are the following:

ILog – Genova, Italy (ILOG)

ILOG is an engineering company established in 2004 expressly to develop Metrocargo, an innovative concept of intermodal shipment based on setting up a network of terminals connected by scheduled trains with fixed composition. Patents for Metrocargo have been filed in Europe, US, Canada, Russia, China, Japan and Australia, and ILOG hold the worldwide license.
ILOG established MCA Metrocargo Automazioni srl with industrial partners with specific experience in automation and mechanical handling. Partners of ILOG are engineers and corporate managers with experience in company management, logistics and project management. In the past years research and prototyping were advanced using own funds and public contributions, and the results discussed in meetings and workshops

Molinari Rail AG – Winterthur, Switzerland (MOL)

Molinari Rail AG is an independent engineering company, with strong roots in Switzerland, actively operating throughout Europe. Molinari Rail is specialist in Project Management and Project Controlling for Transportation Systems in general. Molinari Rail customers are transport companies as well as engineering companies and rolling stock manufacturers. The main focus of Molinari Rail in the last years has been in engineering, designing and commissioning issues in rolling stock projects. They were also involved in the streamlining and re-direction of organisations and projects, improving efficiency and improving customer satisfaction in technical and commercial issues. Molinari Rail analyses and redirects processes and develops new tools for an efficient realisation of projects and tasks. The long experience of Molinari Rail staff in engineering and design, in maintenance of rolling stock, in the operation of rail companies as well as the training of engine drivers and the maintenance staff allows the company to offer customised services.

WITT Industrie Elektronik – Berlin, Germany (WITT)

WITT was established in 1972 as a small, committed engineering office. In the following years Witt continuously increased its range of expertise and extended their offer to the field of design, development and manufacture of industrial electronic components and related services. Today it employs 20 highly qualified people. Witt core business is industrial electronics and rail electronics. In the field of industrial electronics Witt manufactures automatic inspection and test units, both as single small units and as complex devices, inclusive of engineering services.
In the field of rail electronics Witt provide the full range of electronic devices needed for the power supply of DC traction systems, and have special expertise in the dynamic and static measuring of track components and vehicles.

Systems Navigator – The Hague, The Netherlands (SYS)

Systems Navigator is a system engineering and software company whose activity is targeted to Operation Research type of applications, specialising in discrete event simulation. Systems Navigators provides solutions to a variety of industries and logistics processes in the European market. Systems Navigator designs, implements and maintains complex decision support systems to allow their clients to achieve better utilisation of resources, higher performances and higher quality.

Imavis Srl – Bologna, Italy (IMA)

The company was established in 2000 as a spin-off company of Università di Bologna (Italy) by a group of scientific researchers and IT professionals. Today Imavis is a well established software development company with headquarters in Bologna. The group of developers is constantly growing and at present is composed of 10 people with diversified education qualifications and background: six computer scientists, three engineers, and a web and graphics designer. Since 2002 Imavis is on the market with video-surveillance software and hardware products.
The company focuses on image and video analysis, with particular reference to the video-surveillance market. The core business is the design and the development of products and solutions that follow and anticipate the market needs.

Previous THE EU partly funded the research project VIT – Vision for Innovative Transport that was aimed at providing some complements to the Metrocargo technology. 
The object of VIT was the development of specific portions of innovative technologies for automatic and secure handling of containers and swap bodies for intermodal shipment, primarily functional to the Metrocargo technology though retaining an intrinsic technical value that will make them attractive for the general market.

The general strategy of the SMEs that participated together in the MIT research project is to bring Metrocargo to the market and start selling the equipment, where it can work as a stand-alone container handler (such as in port to dry-port shuttling) or setting up terminal for the distributed intermodal transport.

At the end of this project the Metrocargo technology will be a fully developed market-ready system that will be widely known among European logistic decision makers.

End 

The project developed according to the scheduled program until its end in July 2013.
European Union and science and technology
Intermodal transport